Rakhi Bandhan was a Bengali television soap opera that premiered on 28 November 2016 and aired on Star Jalsha. Sayanta Modak, Sraboni Bhunia, and Subhrojit Saha played the lead roles. The show as dubbed in Tamil as Minmini Pookal, airing on Vijay Super. The show's revolved round the unique bonding between the young actors Krittika and Soham, who played Rakhi and Bandhan respectively. Krittika was applauded for her comic timing, dialogue delivery and expressions. The show took a leap of 12 years in September 2018 and the young actors were replaced by Subhrajit and Srabani as Bandhan and Rakhi respectively. The show has been produced by Blues Productions.
The show went off air on 3 February after airing 787 episodes and was replaced by Mahapeeth Tarapeeth.

Series overview
Bandhan and Rakhi are orphans. Neglected by their relatives, they are each other's support system. But when fate threatens to tear them apart, they must overcome all the hurdles.

Plot summary 
Rakhi Bandhan is the story of a brother and a sister who lost their parents at tender age. They are neglected by their aunt who makes them do all the household chores. Bandhan takes an oath to bring Rakhi up as a good person and send her to school and fulfil all her dreams. The story revolves around Bandhan and Rakhi's relationship.

12 years leap
Off late, the show has taken a successful leap as we find Rakhi and Bandhan all grown up, an estrangement threatens to rip them apart. Bandhan still continues to try and bring his sister back under his wings from where she'd taken off, driven by circumstances. Bandhan is determined to mend a straining relationship with his sister and the interpersonal relationship between two siblings still forms the core of the show.

Cast
 Krittika Chakraborty as Rakhi
 Shrabani Bhunia as Adult Rakhi.
 Soham Basu Roy Chowdhury as Bandhan 
Subhrojit Saha as Adult Bandhan.
 Sayanta Modak as Ved (Rakhi's husband)
 Subrata Mitra as Police Kaku 
 Amitabha Bhattacharrya as Doctor Babu
 Rita Koiral / Chaitali Chakraborty as Malina Chatterjee (Bandhan and Rakhi's elder paternal aunt, Bittu's mother)
 Subhasish Mukherjee as Late Amaresh Chatterjee (Bandhan's and Rakhi's elder paternal uncle, Bittu's father,Malina's husband)
 Anirban Ghosh as Late Kumaresh Chatterjee (Bandhan and Rakhi's late father, Amaresh's younger brother)
Piyali Basu as Uttara/Swati (Rakhi and Bandhan's mother)
Aditi Chatterjee as Rikhiya,a principal
 Rana Mitra as Rikhiya's husband
 Kushal Chakraborty as Sabyasachi, a lawyer
 Indrani Majumder as Sabyasachi's wife
Pradip Dhar as Madan
Arpita Dutta Chowdhury as Damayanti (Rakhi and Bandhan's Mami)
Debjani Chattopadhyay as Anamika Banerjee
Gaurav Ghosal as Dil
Moumita Chakraborty as Jagatjanani
Saikat Das as Tiyash
Boni Mukherjee as Deepika
 Kanchana Maitra
 Goutam Dey
Tanushree Saha
Indrakshi Nag as Isha
 Manoj Ojha as Bandhan's adoptive father
 Rupsha Chakraborty as Bandhan's adoptive mother

References 

2016 Indian television series debuts
2019 Indian television series endings
Bengali-language television programming in India
Star Jalsha original programming